An opposition proceeding is an administrative process available under the patent and trademark law of many jurisdictions which allows third parties to formally challenge the validity of a pending patent application ("pre-grant opposition"), of a granted patent ("post-grant opposition"), or of a trademark.

Patents

European Patent Office

In the context of the proceedings at the European Patent Office (EPO), third parties may challenge the validity of a granted European patent by filing a post-grant opposition under the European Patent Convention (EPC). The term for filing an opposition with the EPO is nine months from the publication of the mention of the grant of the European patent in the European Patent Bulletin.

France
Opposition proceedings may be filed against French patents granted since April 1, 2020. The term for filing an opposition with the National Institute of Industrial Property (INPI) is nine months from the grant of the French patent. An opposition may be filed by a strawman.

United States
Under United States patent law, an opposition proceeding is called a reexamination. Post-grant review provisions of the new patent law may affect a potential patent infringement defendant's strategies in filing a declaratory judgment action. Subsequent to the Leahy–Smith America Invents Act (2011), any third party can challenge the validity of an issued patent using either post-grant review under 35 U.S.C. § 321 or inter partes review under 35 U.S.C. § 311.  Both proceedings became effective September 16, 2012.

Trademarks

In the case of trademarks, third parties may use opposition proceedings to "oppose" the acceptance of a trademark application after it has been accepted and published for opposition purposes. If an opposition is defeated the trademark will proceed to registration. Some jurisdictions operate a "post-grant" opposition system, whereby opposition is not possible until after registration (e.g. Japan).

Canada

In Canada, any third party can file a statement of opposition to stop a trademark from being registered for at least one of the reasons set out in the Trademarks Act and Trademarks Regulations. A statement of opposition can only be filed during the two-month period after a trademark application is approved by the Canadian Intellectual Property Office (CIPO) and advertised in the Trademarks Journal. The trademark applicant and opponent then submit pleadings, evidence and arguments to the Trademarks Opposition Board (an administrative body within CIPO), which hears and makes decisions in opposition proceedings. The Board can either refuse the trademark application (in whole or in part) or reject the opposition. This decision can be appealed to the Federal Court of Canada by both the trademark applicant and opponent.

See also
Patent watch
Public participation in patent examination (including a discussion on the possibility, in some jurisdictions, for third parties to file observations during the examination of a patent application, see sub-section "Observations by third parties")

References

External links
Patent Opposition Database, an online resource launched by Doctors without Borders as "a tool which can be used to explore how to challenge unfair patents and their negative impact on access to medicines."

Patent law
Trademark law